Iyara is the headquarters of Ijumu local government area in Kogi State, Nigeria.
The zip code for Iyara is 261103.
The Iyara people are part of the Okun, which is a Yoruba sub group.

Notable people
 Smart Adeyemi, A Serving senator and a past National President of the Nigerian Union of Journalists from 1999 to 2006.
 Oba Michael Asaju, former president, Nigeria Union of Journalist and late king (Eleta) of Iyara land
Olu Obanure, Assistant General Overseer of the Redeemed Christian Church of God RCCG.

References

Populated places in Kogi State